Sterksel is a village in the southern Netherlands, near Eindhoven. It lies within the municipality Heeze-Leende. It's the smallest village of three in the municipality.
The spoken language is "Heeze-en-Leendes", a distinct dialect within the East Brabantian dialect group, quite similar to colloquial Dutch.

History 
The village was first mentioned between 1196 and 1198 as Sterkesele. The suffix means "single roomed house". The first part can either be sterk (strong) or sterke (young cow). Sterksel is an agricultural community from the Middle Ages. Between 1798 until 1915, it was owned by the Pompen family.

Sterksel was home to 99 people in 1840. Broederhuis Providentia is a monastery established in 1915.

Gallery

References

External links
Official Website

Populated places in North Brabant
Heeze-Leende